The 2021–22 season is the 106th season of competitive association football in Thailand.

National teams

Thailand national football team

Results and fixtures

2022 FIFA World Cup qualification

Group G

2020 AFF Championship

Group A

Semi-finals

Finals

AFC competitions

AFC Champions League

Group stage

Group F

Group G

Group H

Group J

Round of 16

Thai competitions

Thai League 1

Thai League 2

Thai League 3

Cup competitions

Thai FA Cup

Thai League Cup

Thailand Champions Cup

Managerial changes 
This is a list of changes of managers within Thai league football:

Notes

References

 
2020 sport-related lists
2021 sport-related lists
2021 in Thai football
Seasons in Thai football